Pavel Kuczynski (1846–1897) was a Polish composer.

Selected works
Gesang des Turmwächters (from the opera Magrita)
Fahrt zum Licht
Gesang an die Ruhe
Totenklage
Geschenke der Genien
Neujahrsgesang
Bergpredigt (for baritone, chorus and orchestra)
130. psalm
piano pieces (Humoreske, Karnevalswalzer, Intermezzo, Phantasiestück)

This article incorporates text from the Brockhaus and Efron Encyclopedic Dictionary, which is in the public domain.

External Links

 Scores by Pavel Kuczynski in digital library Polona

1846 births
1897 deaths
Polish Romantic composers
Polish composers
19th-century classical composers
Polish male classical composers
19th-century male musicians